Engineering research seeks improvements in theory and practice in fields such as (for example) high-speed computation, bioengineering, earthquake prediction, power systems, nanotechnology and construction.

Major contributors to engineering research around the world include governments, private business,
and academia.

The results of engineering research can emerge in journal articles, at academic conferences, and in the form of new products on the market.

Much engineering research in the United States of America takes place under the aegis of the Department of Defense.

Military-related research into science and technology has led to "dual-use" applications, with the adaptation of weaponry, communications and other defense systems for the military and other applications for civilian use. Programmable digital computers and the Internet which connects them, the GPS satellite network, fiber-optic cable, radar and lasers provide examples.

See also
 List of engineering schools
 Engineer's degree
 Engineering studies
 Engineering education research

References

Research by field
Engineering disciplines